XOX Betsey Johnson is an American reality television series on the Style Network and debuted on May 12, 2013. The series follows Betsey Johnson and her daughter, Lulu, as they struggle to evolve their mother-daughter relationship, move on from filing Chapter 11 bankruptcy and nurture their future careers.

Cast

Main
 Betsey Johnson
 Lulu Johnson
 Brandon Aldridge

Recurring
 Brandon Aldridge — Betsey's design director and CEO of menswear line Highland Duds 
 Ashley — Lulu's assistant
 Angela — Lulu's best friend
 Bogdan — Betsey's trainer
 Janet — Betsey and LuLu's therapist

Episodes

References

2010s American reality television series
2013 American television series debuts
2013 American television series endings
English-language television shows
Style Network original programming
Television series by Magical Elves